Kąrî'kạchä Seid'ou, formerly known as Kelvin Amankwaah, is a Ghanaian academic and artist.

Career 
He worked at the Kwame Nkrumah University of Science and Technology as an art director. He was a lecturer at the KNUST Fine Art Department.

References 

Ghanaian academics
Ghanaian artists
Living people
Year of birth missing (living people)